A Place Called Fantasy is a full-length album by experimental bassist/musician MonoNeon. It was recorded in 2017 and released the same year on July 27.

Track listing

Release and reception
The reviews for the album were generally positive. Elijah C. Watson from Okayplayer wrote that "the 11-track album was heavily inspired by the artist’s time with the late Prince. There’s a dreamlike atmosphere throughout the album, each track seamlessly connected by a pulsing groove that makes MonoNeon’s avant-garde funk so enjoyable."

Personnel
 MonoNeon  – composer, vocals, guitar, bass, keys, drum programming
 AWFM (A Weirdo From Memphis)  – rapper
 Nina Gnewd  – vocals
 Taylor Morse  – vocals
 Lance Lucas  – organ/keys (on live outro of "Ain't Nothing United About America")
 Anthony Knox  – drums (on live outro of "Ain't Nothing United About America")

References

External links
A Place Called Fantasy by MonoNeon
MonoNeon Returns with “A Place Called Fantasy”
MonoNeon Vision

2017 albums